Jacki Nichol (born 10 April 1972) is a Canadian softball player. She competed in the women's tournament at the 2000 Summer Olympics.

References

External links
 

1972 births
Living people
Canadian softball players
Olympic softball players of Canada
Softball players at the 2000 Summer Olympics
People from Swift Current
Softball people from Saskatchewan